Doruneh or Darooneh or Daruneh may refer to:
 Daruneh, Hamadan
 Doruneh, Razavi Khorasan
 Doruneh, Sistan and Baluchestan
 Doruneh Rural District, in Razavi Khorasan Province